Kozhay-Semyonovka is a rural locality (a selo) and the administrative centre of Kozhay-Semyonovsky Selsoviet, Miyakinsky District, Bashkortostan, Russia. The population was 590 as of 2010. There are 5 streets.

Geography 
Kozhay-Semyonovka is located 20 km north of Kirgiz-Miyaki (the district's administrative centre) by road. Keken-Vasilyevka is the nearest rural locality.

References 

Rural localities in Miyakinsky District